Rachel Carson Pilkington (born 28 November 1974) is an Irish actress.

Career
In 2004, Pilkington received an IFTA nomination in the Best Actress in a Supporting Role – Film/TV category for her role in The Clinic. She has been playing the role of Jane Black in RTÉ soap opera Fair City since 2013.

Personal life
She is the daughter of the actor Joe Pilkington who played Eamonn Maher in the television serial, The Riordans. She is divorced and has a child. Pilkington follows a vegan diet.

Filmography

References

External links

21st-century Irish actresses
Living people
1974 births
Actors from County Tipperary